The Christchurch Art Gallery Te Puna o Waiwhetū, commonly known as the Christchurch Art Gallery, is the public art gallery of the city of Christchurch, New Zealand. It has its own substantial art collection and also presents a programme of New Zealand and international exhibitions. It is funded by Christchurch City Council. The gallery opened on 10 May 2003, replacing the city's previous public art gallery, the Robert McDougall Art Gallery, which had opened in 1932.

The Māori elements of the name are explained as follows:  honours waipuna, the artesian spring beneath the gallery and  refers to one of the tributaries in the immediate vicinity, which flows into the River Avon.  may also be translated as ‘water in which stars are reflected’.

History
The previous public art gallery, the Robert McDougall Art Gallery, opened on 16 June 1932 and closed on 16 June 2002. It was located in the Christchurch Botanic Gardens, adjacent to Canterbury Museum, where the building still stands unused, as of 2019.

Christchurch City Council committed funds to buying land for a new gallery in 1995 and purchased the Christchurch Art Gallery site in 1996. A competition to design the new gallery was launched in 1998.

The building 
The gallery's building was designed by the Buchan Group. The gallery's forecourt has a large sculpture, Reason for Voyaging, which was the result of a collaboration between the sculptor Graham Bennett and the architect David Cole.

The building was used as Civil Defence headquarters for Christchurch following the 2010 Canterbury earthquake, and again after the February 2011 Christchurch earthquake. The gallery was designed to deal with seismic events. The gallery's foundation, a concrete raft slab that sits on the surface of the ground, evenly distributes earthquake forces. However, it sustained some damage during the earthquake. The gallery building was used as a Civil Defence headquarters for seven months after the 2011 Christchurch earthquake, and did not reopen until 19 December 2015 due to the need for extensive refurbishments and improvements.

Directors
Although the Robert McDougall Art Gallery opened in 1932, the first paid director, William Baverstock, was appointed in 1960 (he had previously served as honorary curator from 1949).

 1960–1969: William Baverstock (1893–1975) 
 1969–1979: Brian Muir (1943–1989) 
 1979–1981: T. L. Rodney Wilson (1945–2013) 
 1981–1995: John Coley
 1995–2006: Tony Preston
 2006–2018: Jenny Harper (b. 1950)
 2018–present: Blair Jackson

Gallery

References

External links 

 Christchurch Art Gallery
 Illustrated catalogue of the Robert McDougall Art Gallery, Whitcombe & Tombs, 1933.
 The Robert McDougall Art Gallery 1932–1982 

Art galleries established in 2003
Art museums and galleries in Christchurch
Museums in Christchurch
Christchurch Central City
2003 establishments in New Zealand
2011 Christchurch earthquake